Karachi is the largest city in Pakistan.

Karachi may also refer to:

 Karachi Cantonment
 Karachi Division
 Karachi Central District
 Karachi East District
 Karachi South District
 Karachi West District
New Karachi Town
List of people from Karachi

Other 

 Karachay–Cherkessia
 Karachay Autonomous Oblast
 Karachay–Cherkess Autonomous Oblast
 Karachiman, a village in Azerbaijan.
 Karachiya, a town in Gujarat, India.
 Karachik

 Kulachi (tribe)
 Karashi
 Zafar Karachiwala, Indian film actor
 Karachia
Garachi, a Romany ethnic group of Azerbaijan

See also
 
 
 Qarachi (disambiguation)
 Krachi (disambiguation)
 Kilinochchi District of Sri Lanka, also known as Karachchi